Adham Khan's Tomb is the 16th-century tomb of  Adham Khan, a general of the Mughal Emperor Akbar. He was the younger son of Maham Anga, Akbar's wet nurse thus also his foster brother. However, when Adham Khan murdered Akbar’s favourite general Ataga Khan in May 1562, Akbar immediately ordered his execution by defenestration from the ramparts of the Agra Fort.

The tomb was built in 1562, and lies to the South-West of the Qutub Minar, Mehrauli, Delhi, immediately before one reaches the town of Mehrauli, it is now a protected monument by Archaeological Survey of India. The tomb is opposite Mehrauli bus terminus and many passengers use it as a place to wait.

Architecture

It lies on the walls of Lal Kot and rising from a terrace enclosed by an octagonal wall provided with low towers at the corners. It consists of a domed octagonal chamber in the Lodhi Dynasty style and Sayyid dynasty early in the 14th century. It has a verandah on each side pierced by three openings. It is known popularly as Bul-bulaiyan (a Labyrinth or Maze), for a visitor often loses his way amidst the several passages in the thickness of its walls.

History

Adham Khan, son of Maham Anga, a wet nurse of Akbar, was a nobleman and general in Akbar's army. In 1561, he fell out with Ataga Khan, Akbar's Prime Minister and husband of Jiji Anga, another wet nurse, and killed him, whereupon he was thrown down from the ramparts of Agra Fort twice, by the order of the emperor Akbar and died 

His mother after fortieth day of mourning also  died out of grief, and both were buried in this tomb believed to be commissioned built by Akbar, in a conspicuous octagonal design, not seen in any Mughal building of that era, a designed perhaps designated to the traitors, as it was common design features visible in the tombs of the previous Sur Dynasty, and also the Lodhi dynasty now within the present Lodhi Gardens (Delhi), which the Mughals considered traitors.

In 1830s, a British officer named Blake of Bengal Civil Service, converted this tomb into his residential apartment and removed the graves to make way for his dining hall. Though the officer died soon, it continued to be used as a rest house for many years by the British, and at one point even as a police station and a post office. The tomb was vacated and later restored by the orders of Lord Curzon, and the grave of Adham Khan has since been restored to the site, and lies right below the central dome, though that of his mother Maham Anga never was.

Further reading
 Adham Khan's Tomb The Delhi that No-one Knows, by R.V. Smith. Orient Longman, 2005. . p. 18.
 Mughals Dictionary of Islamic architecture, by Andrew Petersen. Routledge, 1996. . p. 203.
 The Cambridge History of India: Mughal Period, by Edward James Rapson. Published by University Press, 1937. p. 532 Tomb of Adham Khan.
 Anthony Welch, "The Emperor's Grief: Two Mughal Tombs", Muqarnas 25, Frontiers of Islamic Art and Architecture: Essays in Celebration of Oleg Grabar's Eightieth Birthday (2008): 255–273.
 Delhi and Its Neighbourhood, by Y. D. Sharma. Published by Director General, Archaeological Survey of India, 1974. p. 60–61.
 Islamic Tombs in India : The Iconography and Genesis of Their Design, by Fredrick W. Bunce. (Series : Contours of Indian Art and Architecture No. 2. 2004.) . Chapt. 20.
 Annual York-Noor Lecture Series: "Murder, Mausolea and the Emperor Akbar: Two Early Mughal Tombs", York University
 Mughal Architecture of Delhi : A Study of Mosques and Tombs (1556–1627 A.D.), by Praduman K. Sharma, Sundeep, 2001, . Chap. 9.

References

External links

 Adam Khan's Tomb
 The Qutub Complex in Delhi – Adham Khan's Tomb
 Images of Adham Khan's Tomb Indira Gandhi National Centre for the Arts (IGNCA)
 Adham Khan's Tomb wikimapia. 
 The tomb of Adham Khan near the Qutb Minar in Sir Thomas Metcalfe's Diary, 1843 British Library

Mughal tombs
Buildings and structures completed in 1561
Mehrauli
Domes
Mausoleums in Delhi
Mazes
1561 establishments in India
Buildings on the Indian Archaeological Register
Monuments of National Importance in Delhi